Daniela Mercury & Cabeça de Nós Todos is an urban album, of pop-rock, released in 2013 by the Brazilian singer Daniela Mercury with the group Cabeça de Nós Todos.

Track listing

References

Daniela Mercury albums
2013 albums